The Fee Reimbursement Scheme (also known as the Post-matric Scholarship Scheme) is a student education sponsorship programme of the Government of Andhra Pradesh. It supports students from lower economic strata in the state. In 2012–13, more than 600,000 students in professional colleges were covered under the scheme, including around 150,000 students in engineering colleges. From 2013 to 2014, the government made the possession of an Aadhaar card a mandatory requirement for fee reimbursement procedures for the beneficiaries.

History
The Fee Reimbursement programme is implemented as part of post matric scholarship. Government Order Ms No. 90 Social Welfare Dept. dated 30.7.2002 and GO Ms No 33 Backward Class Welfare Dept. dated 24.9.2003 respectively were issued by TDP government led by N. Chandrababu Naidu, providing fee reimbursement for SC/ST students and BC students respectively. But this fee reimbursement for BC students were on non-saturation basis. Only 40% of fees was reimbursed for BC students where as 100% was getting reimbursed for SC/ST students. In year 2008 R. Krishnaiah, president of BC Welfare Association, demanded the government to provide full 100% fee reimbursement to BC students as well inline with the SC/ST students. The government issued a committee on Krishniah's demands, but it did not approve the demands. R. Krishnaiah announced a fast if the demands were not fulfilled. Responding to this demands congress government, led by Y. S. Rajasekhara Reddy issued GO.Ms.No 18 Dated 27-6-2008 to provide scholarship on saturation basis for BC Students as well. In July 2009, the proposal was made to introduce fees reimbursement for Economically Backward Class students and Ms No. 102 Higher Education Dept. dated 29.7.2009 was issued by the government which provided guidelines for implementation of the scheme. Later G.O.Ms.No. 2 BACKWARD CLASSES WELFARE (B2) was issued by congress government led by chief minister Konijeti Rosaiah transferring EBC scholarships to Backward Class Welfare Department and providing the administrative sanction for the Fees Reimbursement for EBC students. The government spent ₹ 2000 crores in 2008–09; this rose to ₹ 5000 crores in 2012–13. This was because only first years who took admit in the year 2008 got full fee reimbursement but later on the scheme was implemented to other years as well after the demise of Rajasekhar Reddy. Due to this increase in the budget allocation, the government decided to provide full fees reimbursement for only students who got rank below 10000 in EAMCET, and a maximum of Rs.35000 for ranks above 10000.

Programmes covered
The scheme covers professional programmes, including Bachelor's in engineering, medicine, education, etc. and Master's in business administration, computer applications, etc.

Controversies
The scheme has faced criticism due to the misuse of the policy by some institutions. The government reduced the scholarship amount to Rs.35,000 in 2013–14. After the separation of Telangana from Andhra Pradesh, the fee reimbursement became a bone of contention between the two states. The Telangana government introduced a new clause affecting the eligibility of around 39,000 Andhra-origin students who have completed their high school and college in Telangana.

References

Government welfare schemes in Andhra Pradesh
Education in Andhra Pradesh
2018 establishments in Andhra Pradesh